"The Geographical Pivot of History" is an article submitted by Halford John Mackinder in 1904 to the Royal Geographical Society that advances his heartland theory. In this article, Mackinder extended the scope of geopolitical analysis to encompass the entire globe.

The World-Island and the Heartland

According to Mackinder, the Earth's land surface was divisible into:
The World-Island, comprising the interlinked continents of Europe, Asia, and Africa (Afro-Eurasia). This was the largest, most populous, and richest of all possible land combinations.
The offshore islands, including the British Isles and the islands of Japan.
The outlying islands, including the continents of North America, South America, and Oceania.

The Heartland lay at the centre of the world island, stretching from the Volga to the Yangtze and from the Himalayas to the Arctic. Mackinder's Heartland was the area then ruled by the Russian Empire and after that by the Soviet Union, minus the Kamchatka Peninsula region, which is located in the easternmost part of Russia, near the Aleutian Islands and Kurile islands.

Strategic importance of Eastern Europe
Later, in 1919, Mackinder summarised his theory thus:

Any power which controlled the World-Island would control well over 50% of the world's resources. The Heartland's size and central position made it the key to controlling the World-Island.

The vital question was how to secure control for the Heartland. This question may seem pointless, since in 1904 the Russian Empire had ruled most of the area from the Volga to Eastern Siberia for centuries. But throughout the nineteenth century:

 The West European powers had combined, usually successfully, in the Great Game to prevent Russian expansion.
 The Russian Empire was huge but socially, politically and technologically backward – i.e. inferior in "virility, equipment and organization".

Mackinder held that effective political domination of the Heartland by a single power had been unattainable in the past because:

 The Heartland was protected from sea power by ice to the north and mountains and deserts to the south.
 Previous land invasions from east to west and vice versa were unsuccessful because lack of efficient transportation made it impossible to assure a continual stream of men and supplies.

He outlined the following ways in which the Heartland might become a springboard for global domination in the twentieth century (Sempa, 2000):

 Successful invasion of Russia by a Western European nation (most probably Germany). Mackinder believed that the introduction of the railroad had removed the Heartland's invulnerability to land invasion. As Eurasia began to be covered by an extensive network of railroads, there was an excellent chance that a powerful continental nation could extend its political control over the Eastern European gateway to the Eurasian landmass. In Mackinder's words, "Who rules East Europe commands the Heartland."
 A Russo-German alliance. Before 1917 both countries were ruled by autocrats (the Tsar and the Kaiser), and both could have been attracted to an alliance against the democratic powers of Western Europe (the US was isolationist regarding European affairs, until it became a participant of World War I in 1917). Germany would have contributed to such an alliance its formidable army and its large and growing sea power.
 Conquest of Russia by a Sino-Japanese empire (see below).
The combined empires' large East Asian coastline would also provide the potential for it to become a major sea power. Mackinder's "Who rules East Europe commands the Heartland" does not cover this scenario, probably because the previous two scenarios were seen as the major risks of the nineteenth century and the early 1900s.

One of Mackinder's personal objectives was to warn Britain that its traditional reliance on sea power would become a weakness as improved land transport opened up the Heartland for invasion and/or industrialisation (Sempa, 2000).

A more modern development to which the heartland theory can still be attributed to exist is through Russia's oil pipelines scandals. Heartland theory implies that the world island is full of resources to be exploited. "Any initiative by the United States to open the market access in Central Asia implies that this state is targeted for the exploration of multinational energy companies. The efforts for domination of the exploration of natural resources are also apparent in the case of Russia. Study found that Russia wants to have pipelines pass through its own territory. However the Russian energy companies are working on behalf of market interests, they often constrain the behaviour of the state".

Influence on other geopolitical models
Signs of Mackinder's Heartland Theory can be found in "Crush zone" of James Fairgrieve, Rimland of Nicholas Spykman, "Shutterbelt" of Saul Cohen and the Intermediate Region of Dimitri Kitsikis. There is a significant geographical overlap between the "Inner Crescent" of Mackinder, Crush zone, Rimland and Shutterbelt, as well as between the Heartland or "Pivot Area" and the Intermediate Region.

Kitsikis excludes Germany-Prussia and north-eastern China from the Intermediate Region. Mackinder, on the other hand, excludes North Africa, Eastern Europe and the Middle East from the Heartland. The reason for this difference is that Mackinder's model is primarily geo-strategic, while Kitsikis' model is geo-civilizational. However, the roles of both the Intermediate Region and the Heartland are regarded by their respective authors as being pivotal in the shaping of world history.

Max Ostrovsky discredited the existence of any permanent geographic pivot of history because climate is impermanent but his ultimate model echoes Mackinder: Who rules the largest temperate zone with the most optimum rainfall, rules the world.

President Barack Obama initiated "Pivot to Asia" meaning US strategic, diplomatic and economic focus on the region. Mackinder's term became a popular buzzword after Obama's Secretary of State Hillary Clinton authored "America's Pacific Century," in Foreign Policy. Former Chinese State Councilor, Dai Bingguo, suggested to Hillary Clinton: "Why don't you 'pivot out of here?'" Mackinder did not expect how far his pivot concept would go.

Criticism
K. S. Gadzhev, in his book Introduction to Geopolitics, raises a series of objections to Mackinder's Heartland; to start with that the significance physiography is given there for political strategy is a form of geographical determinism.

Critics of the theory also argue that in modern day practice, the theory is outdated due to the evolution of technological warfare, as at the time of publication, Mackinder only considered land and sea powers. In modern day time there are possibilities of attacking a rival without the need for a direct invasion via cyber attacks, aircraft or even use of long range missile strikes.

Other critics of the theory argue that "Mackinderian analysis is not rational because it assumes conflict in a system where there is none. Such argument of the critics [however] is hardly found out because a variety of literatures repeatedly cites the geostrategic importance for USA security in fighting terrorism and preventing Russian dominance..."

According to Matt Rosenberg, Mackinder's theory was never fully proven as no singular power in history has had control of all three of the regions at the same time. The closest this ever occurred was during the Crimean War (1853–1856) whereby Russia attempted to fight for control over the Crimean Peninsula, ultimately losing to the French and the British. Rosenberg does not name which three regions he means, nor explains how any power involved in the Crimean War came close to control of those three regions.

A.F.K. Organski was more focused in his criticism. Those who have ruled East Europe, he wrote, have not commanded the world. "Extremists like Mackinder have gone too far."

See also

 Intermediate Region
 The Grand Chessboard
 Intermarium
 Land hemisphere
 Rimland
 Eurasianism
 Invasion of the United States

References

Further reading
 CIA's Analysis of the Soviet Union, 1947–1991 links to a large number of CIA analyses of Soviet economic, technological and military capability (as well as e.g. foreign policy), all in PDF format.
Christopher, J.F. "Sir Halford Mackinder, Geopolitics, and Policymaking in the 21st Century", Parameters, Summer 2000
 Mackinder, H.J. "The Geographical Pivot of History", in "Democratic Ideals and Reality", Washington, DC: National Defense University Press, 1996, pp. 175–193.
 Odom, W.E. (1998) "The Collapse of the Soviet Military". Yale University Press. 
 Sempa, F.P. (2000) "Mackinder's World" describes the background to Mackinder's thinking, the development of his theory after World War I (with many quotes) and its influence on geo-strategic thinking.
 Venier, Pascal. "The Geographical Pivot of History and Early 20th Century Geopolitical Culture", Geographical Journal, vol. 170, no 4, December 2004, pp. 330–336.
 William R. Keylor, The Twentieth-Century World and Beyond: An International History Since 1900, 2006.

External links
The Geographical Pivot of History (The Internet Archive version) The Geographical Journal, April 1904.
 Democratic Ideals and Reality, Washington, DC: National Defence University Press, 1996, pp. 175–194

Non-fiction books about the Great Game
Works about the theory of history
Works about geopolitics
1904 documents